The Coalition on the Environment and Jewish Life (COEJL) is a leading Jewish environmental organization in the United States. It was founded in 1993 and is based in Washington, D.C.

COEJL promotes policies and programs that help increase energy efficiency, promote energy independence and security, protect land and water resources, and build core Jewish knowledge on environmental issues while serving as a Jewish voice in the broader interfaith community. COEJL has also begun to focus specifically on federal advocacy on international climate finance, the Clean Power Plan, and conservation since moving to Washington. COEJL has been an initiative at the Jewish Council for Public Affairs since 1993 and serves as the Jewish partner in the National Religious Partnership on the Environment (NRPE).

See also
Jewish Council for Public Affairs

External links
Coalition on the Environment and Jewish Life official site

1993 establishments in the United States
Environmental organizations based in Washington, D.C.
Judaism and environmentalism
Jewish organizations
Organizations established in 1993